Aleksandr Maksimenko may refer to:

 Aleksandr Maksimenko (footballer, born 1996), Russian football player
 Aleksandr Maksimenko (footballer, born 1998), Russian football player